Nizhnelomovsky District is an administrative and municipal district (raion), one of the twenty-seven in Penza Oblast, Russia. It is located in the northwest of the oblast. Its administrative center is the town of Nizhny Lomov. Population: 41,974 (2010 Census);  The population of Nizhny Lomov accounts for 54.0% of the district's total population.

References

Notes

Sources

 
Districts of Penza Oblast